Petronella "Nel" Burgerhof (6 December 1908 – 15 September 1991) was a Dutch gymnast who won the gold medal as member of the Dutch gymnastics team in the 1928 Summer Olympics.

In 1931 Burgerhorf married Toon Houtschild in her hometown. She was born and died in The Hague.

References
 profile
 Genealogical data

External links
 

1908 births
1991 deaths
Dutch female artistic gymnasts
Olympic gymnasts of the Netherlands
Gymnasts at the 1928 Summer Olympics
Olympic gold medalists for the Netherlands
Gymnasts from The Hague
Olympic medalists in gymnastics
Medalists at the 1928 Summer Olympics
20th-century Dutch women